Littoraria ardouiniana is a species of sea snail, a marine gastropod mollusk in the family Littorinidae, the winkles or periwinkles.

Distribution
Vietnam.

Description

Ecology
Littoraria ardouiniana is a predominantly mangrove-associated species.

References

Littorinidae
Gastropods described in 1885
Taxa named by Pierre Marie Heude